McMansion Hell is a blog that humorously critiques McMansions, large suburban homes typically built from the 1980s to 2008 and known for their stylistic attempt to create the appearance of affluence using mass-produced architecture. The website is run by Kate Wagner, an architectural writer. The blog is hosted by Tumblr, with 65,000 followers in July 2018. It was created in July 2016.

Attributes 
The blog uses Wagner's commentary atop images of the interiors and exteriors of McMansions, using arrows to note features she finds questionable or in poor taste. Besides critiquing the homes themselves, the website also criticizes the perceived material culture of wastefulness McMansions can represent, gives anecdotes of situations when McMansions have been a poor financial investment, and provides other essays on urban planning and architectural history. The blog offers subscriptions with bonus content, generating sufficient funding for Wagner to work on the blog full-time.

Kate Wagner holds a master's degree in audio science with a specialty in architectural acoustics from Johns Hopkins University's Peabody Conservatory.

Reception 
The blog has acquired many fans, with 65,000 followers in July 2018. Wagner has been interviewed for Paper, The Washington Post, Slate, Business Insider, The Hairpin, and Der Spiegel in Germany, and has appeared on the 99% Invisible podcast. She has gained wide name recognition in architectural circles and has published in the Architectural Digest, The Atlantic, and Jacobin.

In June 2017, Zillow sent Wagner a letter claiming that McMansion Hell violated Zillow's Terms of Service by "reproducing, modifying, and publicly displaying" content from Zillow listings. The letter also suggested that McMansion Hell was in violation of copyright law, was unprotected by fair use, and by interfering with Zillow's business interests may have been violating the Computer Fraud and Abuse Act. After Wagner obtained legal representation from the Electronic Frontier Foundation, Zillow declined to pursue legal action against McMansion Hell.

References

External links

Video of TEDx presentation by Wagner about McMansions

American blogs
Photoblogs
Architecture critics
American photography websites
Works about suburbs